The Influence is a studio album by American jazz guitarist Jimmy Raney, released in 1975 for Xanadu Records.

Reception

The Allmusic review awarded the album 4 stars stating "After barely being on records at all from 1957-1974 (just three albums of material and only one and a half albums during 1958-1973), the great guitarist Jimmy Raney had several opportunities to record for Xanadu between 1975-1976. His debut for the label consists of six trio numbers with bassist Sam Jones and drummer Billy Higgins, along with a couple of unaccompanied solos".

Track listing

Personnel

 Jimmy Raney - guitar
 Billy Higgins - drums
 Sam Jones - bass

References

1975 albums
Xanadu Records albums
Jimmy Raney albums
Instrumental albums
Albums produced by Don Schlitten